Naga Story: The Other Side of Silence is a 2003 documentary film by Indian film maker Gopal Menon. The film  provides an introduction to the history of the Struggle by Naga people in North- East frontier of the Indian subcontinent, and documents the human rights abuses suffered by the Naga people in more than 50 years of the existence of Independent India. The Naga political struggle is one of the oldest nationality movements in South Asia, continuing till present times.  This film, which took 5 years to complete, is the first comprehensive film about the Naga struggle for identity, peace, and justice.

This film is the Winner of the "Spirit of the Himalayas" First Prize at Netherlands Himalayas Film Festival, Amsterdam, 2004. This Film is withdrawn from Mumbai International Film Festival 2004 by Film Makers along with 6 other films as part of the Campaign Against Censorship by Indian filmmakers and screened at the Protest film festival Vikalp

Festivals

 Telluride Mountain Film Festival, USA
 Banff Mountain Film Festival, Canada
 The Netherlands Himalayas Filmfestival 2004, Amsterdam
 Vikalp: Films for Freedom 2004
 Celebrating Resistances: Peoples Action Week Film Festival 2005
 Signs 2005
 Cochin International Film Festival – 2005
 Kontra Agos:Resistance Film Festival 2007, Ortigas
 Nepal International Indigenous Film Festival 2010

Accolades
The Netherlands Himalayas Film Festival 2004: "Spirit of the Himalayas" First Prize

See also
 Indian general election, 2014 (Nagaland)
 Insurgency in Northeast India

References

External links
  Watch Film in cultureunplugged.com

Further reading
The Naga struggle for sovereignty:It's past and probable future Seminar paper presented to the National Seminar on Peace, Non-violence and National Interest, 26-28 July 1999, Xavier Pfokhrehe Mao (Lecturer, Dept. Of Philosophy, NEHU, Shillong,India) 
Naga Resistance Movement and the Peace Process in Northeastern India article Peace and Democracy in South East Asia Volume 1, Issue 2, 2005. H.Srikanth and C.J.Thomas 
 Naga- A People Struggling for Self Determination International Working Group for Indigenous Affairs 

Human rights abuses in India
Indian documentary films
Documentary films about indigenous rights
2003 documentary films
Nagamese-language films
Naga people
2003 films